Bionicle is a line of Lego construction toys, marketed primarily towards 8-to-16-year-olds. The line originally launched in 2001 as a subsidiary of Lego's Technic series. Over the following decade, it became one of Lego's biggest-selling properties, turning into a franchise and being one of the many factors in saving the company from its financial crisis of the late 1990s. Despite a planned twenty-year tenure, the theme was discontinued in 2010, but was rebooted in 2015 for a further two years.

Unlike previous Lego themes, Bionicle was accompanied by an original story told across a multimedia spectrum. It depicts the exploits of the Toa, heroic biomechanical beings with innate elemental abilities whose duty is to maintain peace throughout their universe. Bionicle's success prompted subsequent Lego themes to use similar story-telling methods.

History

Concept 
After suffering a decade-long downturn in the 1990s, the Lego Group went forward with the idea that a theme with a storyline behind it would appeal to consumers. Their first attempt was the space opera franchise Star Wars, which became an instant success, however, the royalty payments to Lucasfilm marginalized Lego's profits, prompting them to conceive their own story-driven themes, one of which would eventually become Bionicle.

The concept for Bionicle originated from an idea by co-creator Christian Faber named "Cybots", a line of humanoid action figures with attachable limbs and ball-and-socket joints. Faber recalled, "I was sitting with Lego Technic and thought I would love to build a character instead of a car. I thought of this biological thing: The human body is built from small parts into a functional body just like a model. What if you got a box full of spare parts and built a living thing?". He pitched the idea to Lego, but it was initially implemented as the themes Slizer/Throwbots in 1999 and RoboRiders in 2000.

A new project called "BoneHeads of Voodoo Island" was later conceived by Faber and Lego employees Bob Thompson and Martin Riber Andersen from a brief by Erik Kramer that was sent to outside writers, one of whom was Alastair Swinnerton, who rewrote the concept and was later invited to pitch it to the Lego Group at their headquarters in Billund, Denmark. The revised concept was well received and Swinnerton was commissioned to expand his initial pitch into a full 'bible'. On his second visit to Billund, the project was given approval and entitled "Bionicle" at an internal Lego meeting (a portmanteau constructed from the words "biological chronicle", with reference to the word "bionics"). The names "BioKnights" and "Afterman" were also considered prior to the finalization of the brand.

To accompany theme, Lego worked with Swinnerton and the creative agency Advance to create an elaborate story featuring extensive lore centering on half-organic, half-robotic characters and telling it across a vast multimedia spectrum including comic books, novels, games, movies and online content. Māori culture became a key inspiration behind the story and the theme at large. The use of tropical environments and characters based on classical elements were also carried over from Slizer/Throwbots and RoboRiders. The toys themselves would be an expansion of the Lego Technic sub-series, featuring the same building system that was already featured in Slizer/Throwbots and RoboRiders. One particular element – the then-innovative ball-and-socket system which created free joint movement – would feature heavily in Bionicle and be expanded upon in subsequent sets.

Launch and success 
The first wave of Bionicle sets were initially launched in December 2000 in Europe and Australasia as a "test market" to predict how well the series would sell in North America. The official website, explaining the premise of Bionicle, also debuted around the same time. After a positive reception, Bionicle premiered in North America in mid-2001, where it generated massive success and garnered the Lego Group £100 million in its first year. New sets were released every six months, ranging from buildable action figures to play sets and vehicles, and would gradually increase in size and flexibility with every new wave. Collectibles such as weapon ammo and the "Kanohi" masks that certain characters wore were also sold; some became rare and valuable and withheld secret codes that when entered onto the official Bionicle website, provided the user with "Kanoka Points" that enabled them to access exclusive membership material.

As Bionicle's popularity rose, it became one of Lego's most successful properties, accounting for nearly all of their financial turnover from the previous decade. It was named as the #1 Lego theme in 2003 and 2006 in terms of sales and popularity, with other Lego themes at the time failing to match the profits generated by Bionicle. Its popularity led to high web traffic via its official website, averaging more than one million page views per month, and further kinds of merchandise such as clothes, toiletries and fast-food restaurant toy collectibles.

Discontinuation 
On November 24, 2009, Lego announced that production on new Bionicle sets would cease after a final wave was released in 2010. The decision was made due to recent low sales and a lack of new consumer interest in the brand, possibly brought on by its decade-long backstory and extensive lore.

At his request, long-term Bionicle comic book writer and story contributor Greg Farshtey was given permission to continue the Bionicle storyline, with chapters for new serials arranged to be posted regularly on the website BionicleStory.com. However, Farshtey stopped posting new content in 2011 due to his other commitments and the website was shut down in 2013, leaving a number of serials incomplete. Farshtey continues to play an active role in the Bionicle fan community and regularly contributes new story details via online forums and message boards.

Reboot 
Work on a reboot of Bionicle began in 2012. Matt Betteker, a junior designer who worked on Hero Factory, was promoted to senior designer for the project. The theme's comeback was announced on September 19, 2014, with the first wave of sets and story details revealed at New York Comic Con on October 9. Dubbed "Generation 2" by fans and later Lego themselves, the new storyline is based on the premise of the original, albeit with simplified lore and a smaller media platform.

The reboot launched in January 2015 to a mixed reception from toy critics and fans of the original Bionicle franchise, with the playability of the new sets and the inspiration taken from the theme's first wave being praised, but the simplified story and undeveloped characters receiving less positive feedback. 

Lego discontinued the reboot in late 2016, citing low sales, despite plans to release new Bionicle sets through to at least 2017. It is widely believed that a lack of marketing and reliance on fans to promote the theme, coupled with the new simplified story, were factors in Generation 2's decreased interest.

Legacy 
During and after its run, Bionicle became the inspiration for several other Lego themes, including Knights Kingdom, Exo-Force, Ninjago, Legends of Chima and Nexo Knights. They all followed a similar story narrative about a group of heroes (each with varying abilities and skills) battling the henchmen of an ally-turned-foe in a fantasy world. Bionicle writer Greg Farshtey would also go on to write material for the some of these themes, namely Ninjago.

A direct successor theme to Bionicle, Hero Factory, was launched in 2010. It continued to use the building system introduced in Bionicle before evolving into the Character and Creature Building System (CCBS) that would later be carried over into other Lego sets and eventually Bionicle's 2015 reintroduction. Hero Factory itself ceased after 2014.

Despite its ending as a toyline, Bionicle's popularity has persisted and was acknowledged by Lego in its 90th anniversary poll, winning the first round. A promotional Lego System set celebrating Bionicle was released in 2023, featuring brick-built versions of the characters of Tahu and Takua, to which the community responded well to.

Story

Generation 1 (2001–2010) 

Set in a time predating recorded history (described as "the time before time") in a science fantasy universe featuring a diversity of cyborgs, the main story depicts the exploits of the Toa, heroic beings with elemental powers whose sworn duty is to protect the Matoran, the prime populace of their world, and reawaken the Great Spirit Mata Nui, their god-like guardian who was forced into a coma by the actions of the evil Makuta.

The first story arc (2001–2003) takes place on the tropical island of Mata Nui, named after the Great Spirit, and deals with the arrival of the six Toa Mata (later transformed into the more powerful Toa Nuva) and their adventures in protecting the Matoran villagers from Makuta's minions. A heavy emphasis is placed on the Kanohi masks worn by the Toa, which supplement their elemental powers with abilities such as super-strength and super-speed. The second arc (2004–2005) acts as a prequel to the first, set on an island city called Metru Nui. It follows another group of Toa who would go on to become Turaga, the Matoran's elders, and explains how they all came to settle on Mata Nui island. The culminating third arc (2006–2008) sees a new team of Toa set out on a quest to find the Mask of Life, an artifact that can save the dying Mata Nui. A fourth arc (2009), originally envisioned as a soft reboot of the franchise, introduces the desert world of Bara Magna and its inhabitants. However, future storylines were scrapped after Lego cancelled Bionicle later that year and was replaced with one that concluded the main narrative in 2010.

Characters such as the Toa and Matoran are typically divided into tribes based on six "primary" elements: fire, water, air, earth, stone, and ice. Less common "secondary" elements, such as light, gravity and lightning, began being introduced in 2003. The 2009 storyline, which features a different society, uses a similar grouping method for its Glatorian and Agori characters.

The entire saga was developed by a team of Lego employees led by Bob Thompson for a multimedia platform spanning animations, comic books, novels, console and online games, short stories, and a series of direct-to-video films. The majority of comics and novels were written by Greg Farshtey, who also published a number of in-character blogs, serials, and podcasts that expanded the franchise lore. After the toyline was discontinued, publication of these serials continued through to 2011 before halting abruptly due to Farshtey's other commitments.

Generation 2 (2015–2016) 
A reboot of the original story, the revival chronicles the adventures of six elemental Toa heroes who protect the bio-mechanical inhabitants of the mystical island of Okoto from Makuta and his minions. Characters are again divided into six elemental tribes: fire, water, jungle (changed from air for creative reasons), earth, stone and ice. The reboot's multimedia spectrum was scaled back in comparison to the first generation's – online animations, a series of books and graphics novels authored by Ryder Windham, and the animated Netflix series Lego Bionicle: The Journey to One (2016) detail the narrative. Christian Faber and Greg Farshtey served as creative consultants.

Reception 
Initially, the idea of Bionicle faced resistance from company traditionalists as the Lego Group had no experience of marketing a story-based brand of their own. The "war-like" appearance of the characters also went against the company's values of creating sets without themes of modern warfare or violence. Lego reconciled on this statement by claiming that the theme was about "Good versus evil; "good hero warriors" designed to combat "evil enemy fighters" in a mythical universe, so children are not encouraged to fight each other".

The Bionicle franchise was well received over its venture and became one of the Lego Group's biggest-selling properties. At the time of its launch, one reviewer described the sets as "A good combination of assembly and action figure". and first-year sales of £100 million. Bionicle later received a Toy of the Year Award for Most Innovative Toy in 2001 from the Toy Industry Association.

Bionicle's rapid success had a major impact on the Lego Company. Stephanie Lawrence, the global director of licensing for Lego, stated "We've created an evergreen franchise to complement the many event-based properties on the children's market. An increasing number of category manufacturers want to tap into the power of the Bionicle universe, and the key for us now is to manage the excitement to stay true to the brand and the lifestyle of our core consumer."

Since its launch, toy critics have said that Bionicle has changed the way children think and play with Lego products by combining "The best of Lego building with the story telling and adventure of an action figure". Toy statistics have revealed that as of 2009, 85% of American boys aged 6–12 have heard of Bionicle while 45% own the sets.

Māori language controversy 
In 2002, several Māori iwi (tribes) from New Zealand were angered by Lego's lack of respect for some of their words which were used to name certain characters, locations and objects in the Bionicle storyline. A letter of complaint was written, and the company agreed to change the names of certain story elements (e.g., the villagers originally known as "Tohunga" was changed to "Matoran") and met with an agreement with the Māori people to still use a small minority of their words.

In the story, the reason for certain name changes was dubbed as a Naming Ceremony for certain Matoran after doing heroic deeds (though the pronunciations remain the same), an example being the name change of 'Huki' to 'Hewkii'. Other names such as "Toa" meaning "Warrior", "Kanohi" meaning "Face" and "Kōpaka" meaning "Ice" were not changed.

See also 
 List of Bionicle media
 Lego Technic

References

External links 

 BioMedia Project, an online archive of BIONICLE media
 BIONICLEsector01.com, an external wiki
 BZPower.info, a LEGO and BIONICLE news site
 Wall of History, an online compendium of BIONICLE story content

 
2000s toys
2010s toys
Action figures
Cyborgs in fiction
DC Comics titles
Fiction about parasites
Fiction about robots
Bionicle
Products and services discontinued in 2010
Products and services discontinued in 2016
Products introduced in 2000
Products introduced in 2015
Toy controversies